Ryan Christian Kwanten (born 28 November 1976) is an Australian actor and producer. He played Vinnie Patterson from 1997 to 2002 in the Australian soap opera Home and Away. After his stint ended, he joined the American teen drama series Summerland, portraying Jay Robertson. From 2008 to 2014, he played Jason Stackhouse in True Blood. From 2018 to 2019 he produced and starred in the crime drama series The Oath as Steve Hammond. In 2021 he starred in season one of the horror drama anthology series Them as George Bell. In 2022, he portrayed Thomas Weylin in Kindred, a series adaptation based on Octavia E. Butler's celebrated 1979 novel of the same name.

Early life
Kwanten was born one of three brothers in Terrigal, New South Wales. The boys were raised by mother Kris, a Lifeline op shop coordinator, and father Eddie Kwanten, a worker at NSW Maritime. Eddie is Dutch. Ryan's brothers are Mitchell, a musician, and Lloyd, a doctor. Ryan attended St Paul's Catholic College in Manly and later earned a degree in commerce from The University of Sydney.

Career
Kwanten began acting on the television shows A Country Practice, Hey Dad..! and Spellbinder. In 1997, he joined the cast of the Australian soap opera Home and Away, playing lifeguard Vinnie Patterson. He eventually chose to leave the series in 2002, shortly after his character married and became a father. Kwanten had previously guest starred on the serial as Robbie Taylor in 1994.
Moving to the United States, Kwanten was cast as Jay Robertson in Summerland (2004–05). He appeared in the films Flicka (2006), with Maria Bello, Alison Lohman and Tim McGraw, and Dead Silence (2007), a horror film in which he played the leading role, Jamie Ashen.

Kwanten appeared in a Law & Order: Special Victims Unit episode that aired on 2 December 2008, in which he portrayed Dominic Pruitt, a US Marine Corps Master Sergeant accused of raping and murdering a pregnant fellow Marine. In 2009, he starred in the film Don't Fade Away with Mischa Barton and Beau Bridges. In 2010, Kwanten voiced the role of Kludd in the animated-epic film Legend of the Guardians: The Owls of Ga'Hoole, although he was originally set to voice the film's protagonist Sorren before the role went to Jim Sturgess.

Kwanten played the role of Jason Stackhouse in the HBO series True Blood, based on Charlaine Harris's The Southern Vampire Mysteries series of novels, which aired from 2008 until 2014. In 2010 he starred in the psychological thriller Red Hill, which was directed by Patrick Hughes. He won a lead role in the 2013 Joe Lynch comedy-horror film Knights of Badassdom along with Steve Zahn, Summer Glau and Peter Dinklage. In October 2010, it was announced that Kwanten will play Charles Manson in an upcoming, yet-to-be-titled biopic, to be directed by Brad Anderson. In 2012, he appeared in Joe Penna's video "Dual Action". In 2013, Kwanten played Marvel character "Venom" in the short film Truth in Journalism and portrayed Conall in the 2014 action adventure film Northmen: A Viking Saga.

In 2015, Kwanten voiced the role of Blinky Bill, a koala in Blinky Bill the Movie alongside Rufus Sewell, Toni Collette, Robin McLeavy, David Wenham, Richard Roxburgh, Deborah Mailman, and Barry Humphries.

In 2019, Kwanten was a series regular in the second season of Blumhouse Television and Facebook Watch's Sacred Lies: The Singing Bones, playing the character of Peter Wolfe, an inmate and the estranged father of the series' protagonist, Elsie, played by Jordan Alexander. The series takes inspiration from a Brothers Grimm fairy tale as well as real-life murder cases.

From 2018-2019 he produced and starred in the crime drama series The Oath as Steve Hammond. 

His most recent roles include 2067, an Australian-American science fiction film in which he plays Jude Mathers, 2021's Them, as milkman George Bell, and Kindred, a TV adaptation of Octavia Butler’s Novel of the same name.

Filmography

Awards and nominations

References

External links
 
 From vampires to superheroes: Ryan Kwanten talks 'Griff the Invisible

1976 births
20th-century Australian male actors
21st-century Australian male actors
Australian expatriate male actors in the United States
Australian male film actors
Australian male voice actors
Australian male soap opera actors
Australian male television actors
Australian people of Dutch descent
Living people
Male actors from Sydney
University of Sydney alumni
Australian male child actors
Blinky Bill